Bird Wood Cage is the third studio album by English post-punk band The Wolfgang Press, released in 1988 by record label 4AD.

Track list
"King of Soul" 4:02
"Raintime" 4:39
"Bottom Drawer" 4:42
"Kansas" 3:53
"Swing Like a Baby" 4:06
"See My Wife" 3:55
"The Holey Man" 4:16
"Hang on Me (For Papa)" 5:08
"Shut That Door" 5:40

From the "Big Sex" EP
"The Wedding" 3:51
"The Great Leveller" 4:31
"That Heat" 4:23
"God's Number" 4:39

References

External links 
 

1988 albums
The Wolfgang Press albums